Maria Goloviznina (born 5 June 1979) is a Russian former tennis player.

She has career-high WTA rankings of 135 in singles, achieved on 31 March 2003, and 139 in doubles, reached on 3 August 1998. She won two singles titles and five doubles titles on tournaments of the ITF Circuit.

Goloviznina retired from tennis in 2012.

ITF Circuit finals

Singles: 8 (2 titles, 6 runner-ups)

Doubles: 13 (5 titles, 8 runner-ups)

External links
 
 

Russian female tennis players
1979 births
Living people
Tennis players from Moscow
Universiade medalists in tennis
Universiade gold medalists for Russia
Medalists at the 2003 Summer Universiade
20th-century Russian women
21st-century Russian women